A Bibliography of books about Nigerian women and studies:

A

C

E

G

H

I

J

M

N

O

R

S

T

Anon

See also
Bibliography of African women

Books about Africa
Books about women
African studies
Books about Nigeria
Women in Nigeria
Lists of books